Alexander Guttenplan (born 8 June 1990) is a former student primarily known as the captain of the team from Emmanuel College, Cambridge that won the University Challenge TV quiz show in 2010, scoring 315 points to 100 against St John's College, Oxford, in the final.  His performance in this has been compared with that of Gail Trimble.  He also "got the better" of presenter Jeremy Paxman, in an exchange which became an Internet sensation. He has hundreds of fans who call themselves Guttenfans: "Guys want to be him, girls want to be with him!". He also took part in a special edition of Only Connect, leading a team from University Challenge against the champions of the first series of Only Connect, the Crossworders. In September 2017, Guttenplan appeared as part of "Team Emma" on Eggheads.

Guttenplan is of Jewish and Greek ancestry. His father, D. D. Guttenplan of U.S. Jewish origin, and mother Maria Margaronis from Greece, are both writers. He has two siblings. He was educated at the Hall School Hampstead and Westminster School, where he showed prodigious talent in a school quiz at the age of eleven. He was chairbeing of the Cambridge University Science Fiction Society. He has a PhD in smart nanomaterials from repeat proteins and amyloid fibrils from the University of Cambridge.

References

1990 births
Living people
Alumni of Emmanuel College, Cambridge
Contestants on University Challenge
People educated at Westminster School, London
American emigrants to England
American people of Jewish descent
English people of Jewish descent
American people of Greek descent
English people of Greek descent
People from New York City
People from Hampstead
American emigrants to the United Kingdom